The N.C. Autonomous College (Narasingh Choudhury Autonomous College) is a 30-acre college in Jajpur, Odisha, India. It was founded in 1946. It is one of the oldest colleges of Odisha and stands tall in the heart of Jajpur district headquarters. The college was initially affiliated to Utkal University but now it has autonomous status from the session 1999-2000 as per UGC and B+ grade accredits with the National Assessment and Accreditation Council NAAC.

History
The college is named after Choudhary Narasingha Charan Mohapatra of Kodandpur, the principal donor of the institution. The college fulfilled a long-cherished desire of the people of this area.

Classes were held in Jajpur High School until 1952. Thereafter the college was shifted to its present campus that stretches in a serene rural setting, about 2 km to the west of the historical town of Jajpur.
Jajpur NC College has lost autonomous status since 2012. However, admission for self-financing courses at Plus III level is being conducted by the college on claims of being autonomous.

References

External links

Department of Higher Education, Odisha
Autonomous Colleges of Odisha
Universities and colleges in Odisha
Jajpur district
Educational institutions established in 1946
1946 establishments in India